Deltorphin I, also known as [D-Ala2]deltorphin I or deltorphin C, is a naturally occurring, exogenous opioid heptapeptide and hence, exorphin, with the amino acid sequence Tyr-D-Ala-Phe-Asp-Val-Val-Gly-NH2. While not known to be endogenous to humans or other mammals, deltorphin I, along with the other deltorphins and the dermorphins, is produced naturally in the skin of species of Phyllomedusa, a genus of frogs native to South and Central America. Deltorphin possesses very high affinity and selectivity as an agonist for the δ-opioid receptor, and on account of its unusually high blood-brain-barrier penetration rate, produces centrally-mediated analgesic effects in animals even when administered peripherally.

See also
 Deltorphin
 Dermorphin

References

Analgesics
Opioids
Peptides